South Walton High School is a public high school in Santa Rosa Beach, Walton County, Florida operated by the Walton County School District. It is located at 645 Greenway Trail  The school's teams compete as the Seahawks.

Sports & Clubs
Football
Soccer
Baseball/Softball
Lacrosse
Volleyball
Beach Volleyball
Track
Cross Country
Weightlifting 
Wrestling
Cheerleading
Dance
Marching and Concert Band
Color Guard/Winter Guard
Spanish Club
Beta Club
Grill Team
FCA
Academic Team
History Club
Art Club
Animal Ambassadors Club
Culinary Club
Chinese Club
Gaming Club
SGA (Student Gov't)

See also
Walton High School (DeFuniak Springs, Florida)
Freeport High School (Freeport, Florida)

References

Educational institutions in the United States with year of establishment missing
Public high schools in Florida
Schools in Walton County, Florida